Ho Chi Ho (born 20 February 1981) is a sailor from Hong Kong, China who won a silver medal at the 2006 Asian Games in the mistral heavy class. He also competed at the 2000 Summer Olympics and the 2004 Summer Olympics.

References

External links
 
 

1981 births
Living people
Hong Kong windsurfers
Hong Kong male sailors (sport)
Olympic sailors of Hong Kong
Sailors at the 2000 Summer Olympics – Mistral One Design
Sailors at the 2004 Summer Olympics – Mistral One Design
Asian Games silver medalists for Hong Kong
Asian Games medalists in sailing
Sailors at the 2006 Asian Games
Sailors at the 2002 Asian Games
Medalists at the 2006 Asian Games
Place of birth missing (living people)